Agent Carter may refer to:

Media
 Agent Carter (film), a 2013 short film released under the Marvel One-Shots series, spun off from the Captain America feature films
 Agent Carter (TV series), a television series spin-off of the short film and the Captain America films

Fictional characters
 Nick Carter (literary character), the Killmaster, a 1964 fictional secret agent revival of an 1884 fictional detective
 Peggy Carter, a supporting character of Captain America in Marvel Comics, and the main character of the short film and TV series and an agent of the SSR
 Peggy Carter (Marvel Cinematic Universe), the live-action adaption
 Sharon Carter, a supporting character in Marvel Comics, who is a relative of Peggy Carter and an agent of S.H.I.E.L.D.
 Sharon Carter (Marvel Cinematic Universe), the live-action adaption
 Harlow Carter, a fictional FBI agent in Empire (2015 TV series)
 Darius Carter, a fictional FBI agent in King & Maxwell
 William Carter, a character in The Bureau: XCOM Declassified

See also
 Carter (disambiguation)